Böttcher's equation, named after Lucjan Böttcher, is the functional equation 

where 
  is a sought function.  
The logarithm of this functional equation amounts to Schröder's equation.

Solution
Solution of functional equation is a function in implicit form. 

Lucian Emil Böttcher sketched a proof in 1904 on the existence of solution: an analytic function F in a neighborhood of the fixed point a, such that:  

This solution is sometimes  called:
 the Böttcher coordinate 
 the Böttcher function
 the Boettcher map.
The complete proof was published by Joseph Ritt in 1920, who was unaware of the original formulation.

Böttcher's coordinate (the logarithm of the Schröder function) conjugates  in a neighbourhood of the fixed point to the function .  An especially important case is when  is a polynomial of degree , and  = ∞ .

Explicit
One can explicitly compute Böttcher coordinates for: 
 power maps  
 Chebyshev polynomials

Examples

For the function h and n=2

the Böttcher function F is:

Applications
Böttcher's equation plays a fundamental role in the part of holomorphic dynamics which studies iteration of polynomials of one complex variable. 
 
Global properties of the  Böttcher coordinate were studied by Fatou
 and Douady and Hubbard.

See also
 Schröder's equation
 External ray

References

Functional equations